WKLJ (1290 AM) is a radio station broadcasting a sports format. The station had previously run CNN news and prior to that, had simulcasted their FM sister station, WCOW-FM for many years. Licensed to Sparta, Wisconsin, United States, the station serves the  La Crosse area. The station is owned by Sparta-Tomah Broadcasting Co., Inc. and features programming from ABC Radio  and ESPN Radio. Former call letters were WCOW.

FM Translator
WKLJ programming is relayed to an FM translator in order to widen the coverage area, especially during nighttime hours; the translator also affords the listener the ability to listen on FM with its high fidelity sound.

References

External links

KLJ
Sports radio stations in the United States
Radio stations established in 1992